Navajo Bridge is the name of twin steel spandrel arch bridges that cross the Colorado River in the Grand Canyon National Park (near Lees Ferry) in northern Coconino County, Arizona, United States. The newer of the two spans carries vehicular traffic on U.S. Route 89A (US 89A) over Marble Canyon between Bitter Springs and Jacob Lake, allowing travel into a remote Arizona Strip region north of the Colorado River including the North Rim of Grand Canyon National Park.

The ferry site had been chosen as the only relatively easy access to the river for both northbound and southbound travelers. By the 1920s, automobile traffic began using the ferry, though it was not considered a safe and reliable crossing due to adverse weather and flooding regularly preventing its operation.

The bridge was officially named the Grand Canyon Bridge when it was dedicated on June 14–15, 1929. The state legislature changed the name to Navajo Bridge five years later in 1934. The original bridge was closed to vehicular traffic after the new span opened in 1995. The old span is still open for pedestrian and equestrian use.

History

Construction of the original Navajo Bridge began in 1927, and the bridge opened to traffic in 1929. The bridge was paid for by the nascent Arizona State Highway Commission (now the Arizona Department of Transportation) in cooperation with the United States Department of the Interior's Bureau of Indian Affairs, as the eastern landing is on the Navajo Nation. The steel spandrel bridge was designed and constructed by the Kansas City Structural Steel Company. During construction, worker Lafe McDaniel died after falling  to the Colorado River below. Supervisors had rejected the idea of rigging safety netting, believing that it would catch on fire from falling hot rivets.

The roadway offers an  surface width with a load capacity of 22.5 tons (although the posted legal weight limit was 40 tons). During the design phase, a wider roadway was considered, but ultimately rejected, as it would have required a costly third arch to be added to the design, and the vehicles of the time did not require a wider road. When the Bridge officially opened on January 12, 1929, the Flagstaff paper proclaimed it "the biggest news in Southwest history."

By 1984, however, Arizona Department of Transportation officials decided that the traffic flow was too great for the original bridge and that a new solution was needed. The sharp corners in the roadway on each side of the approach had become a safety hazard due to low visibility, and deficiencies resulting from the original design's width and load capacity specifications were becoming problematic. The bridge had also become part of US 89A.

Deciding on a solution was difficult, due to the many local interests. Issues included preservation of sacred Navajo land, endangered plant species in Marble Canyon, and the possibility of construction debris entering the river. The original proposal called for merely widening and fortifying the 1928 bridge, but this was ultimately rejected as not able to meet contemporary federal highway standards. Replacement became the only option, and it was eventually decided to entirely discontinue vehicular traffic on the original bridge. A new bridge would be built immediately next to the original and have a considerably similar visual appearance, but would conform to modern highway codes.

The new steel arch bridge was commissioned by the Arizona Department of Transportation and the Federal Highway Administration, and was completed in May 1995, at a cost of $14.7 million. A formal dedication was held on September 14, 1995.

The original Navajo Bridge is still open to pedestrian and equestrian use, and an interpretive center has been constructed on the west side to showcase the historical nature of the bridge and early crossing of the Colorado River. The original bridge has been designated as a Historic Civil Engineering Landmark, and was placed on the National Register of Historic Places on August 13, 1981.

California condors were reintroduced to the area in 1996 and can sometimes be seen on and around Navajo Bridge.

Bridge characteristics

Original bridge (1929)

Construction started June 30, 1927
Bridge opened to traffic January 12, 1929
Total length: 
Steel arch length: 
Arch rise: 
Height above river: 
Width of the roadway: 

Amount of steel: 
Amount of concrete: 
Amount of steel reinforcement: 

Construction cost: $390,000 (equivalent to $ million in )

New bridge (1995)

Total length: 
Steel arch length: 
Arch rise: 
Height above river: 
Width of the roadway: 

Amount of steel: 
Amount of concrete: 
Amount of steel reinforcement: 

Construction cost $14.7 million (equivalent to $ million in )

See also

List of bridges documented by the Historic American Engineering Record in Arizona
List of bridges in the United States by height
List of bridges on the National Register of Historic Places in Arizona
National Register of Historic Places listings in Coconino County, Arizona

Notes

References

External links

 Excellence in Highway Design: Navajo Bridge (archive)
 
 American Society of Civil Engineers – Navajo Bridge (archive)
 
  (note: year of completion is listed incorrectly as 1997)
 85 photos from the construction of Grand Canyon/Navajo bridge
 

Bridges over the Colorado River
Buildings and structures in Coconino County, Arizona
Open-spandrel deck arch bridges in the United States
Truss arch bridges in the United States
Bridges of the United States Numbered Highway System
U.S. Route 89
Transportation in Coconino County, Arizona
Bridges completed in 1927
Road bridges on the National Register of Historic Places in Arizona
National Register of Historic Places in Coconino County, Arizona
Historic Civil Engineering Landmarks
Historic American Engineering Record in Arizona
1929 establishments in Arizona
Steel bridges in the United States
National Register of Historic Places in Grand Canyon National Park